The Hansi hoard was discovered accidentally by children looking for a ball, when they discovered one of the images on January 19, 1982. Hansi is located in the Hisar district of Haryana state, India. Archaeological Survey of India then excavated the completely hoard in 1982.  It contained 58 bronze images of Jain Tirthankaras inside Asigarh Fort dating back to the 8th-9th century, as determined by paleographical analysis, although none of the images are dated.

History 
In 1982 Archaeological Survey of India discovered 58 bronze images of Jain Tirthankaras inside Asigarh Fort. These idols date back to 8th-9th century. These idols were buried to keep it safe from invaders. These idols belong to both Digambar and Shwetambar sect. Some of the images still had coating of sandalwood paste, suggesting that they were in active worship before they were hastily buried in a copper container just before Masud’s invasion at Hansi in A.D. 1037. The hoard included a few implements of worship and included a Buddhist Avalokiteśvara image. These idols are currently placed in Punyoday Jain temple, Hansi.

Initially kept at the Digambar Jain Panchayati temple, they were kept at the Chandigarh Museum. The idols were then given back to the Jain community on December 30, 1991.

Other well-known hoards of Jain bronzes include Akota Bronzes of Gujarat; Chausa hoard and Aluara bronzes from Bihar.

Major images 
The Jain bronzes includes Adinatha, Māllīnātha, Chandraprabha, Mahavira, parents of Jina, Sarasvati and Buddha.

The image of Neminatha seated in Padmasan posture above yakshi Ambika holding her son on left slap flanking with yaksha Gomedha as her consort sitting in lalitasana with 6 tirthankars in Kayotsarga posture engraved in the pedestal.

The other well-known idol is a large idol of Jain shrutidevi Sarasvati.

Stolen and found 

In 2005 the idols were mysteriously stolen on Oct 26, 2005. They were later found after a few days. Some of them were found in Mahabir Colony waterworks after 36 days. Six suspects, with prior criminal backgrounds,  were arrested, they disclosed that they were unable to find buyers.

See also 
 Vasantgarh hoard
 Akota Bronzes
 Chausa hoard

References

Citation

Sources 
 

Jain sculptures